Malacostegina is a sub-order of marine, colonial bryozoans in the order Cheilostomatida. The structure of the individual zooids is generally simple, with an uncalcified, flexible frontal wall. This sub-order includes the earliest known cheilostome, in the genus Pyriporopsis (Electridae).

The genus Christinella is currently incertae sedis within the Malacostegina.

References

Protostome suborders
Cheilostomatida